Sambuugiin Dashdulam (born 27 March 1974) is a Mongolian judoka. She competed in the women's half-heavyweight event at the 2000 Summer Olympics.

References

External links
 
 

1974 births
Living people
Mongolian female judoka
Olympic judoka of Mongolia
Judoka at the 2000 Summer Olympics
Place of birth missing (living people)
Asian Games medalists in judo
Judoka at the 1998 Asian Games
Judoka at the 1994 Asian Games
Asian Games bronze medalists for Mongolia
Medalists at the 1998 Asian Games
Medalists at the 1994 Asian Games
20th-century Mongolian women
21st-century Mongolian women